Reusable Launch Vehicle–Technology Demonstration Programme is a series of technology demonstration missions that has been conceived by the Indian Space Research Organisation (ISRO) as a first step towards realising a Two Stage To Orbit (TSTO) re-usable launch vehicle.

For this purpose, a winged reusable launch vehicle technology demonstrator (RLV-TD) has been configured. The RLV-TD acted as a flying test bed to evaluate various technologies like powered cruise flight, hypersonic flight, and autonomous landing using air-breathing propulsion. Application of these technologies would bring down the launch cost by a factor of 10. This project has no connection with the Avatar spaceplane concept by India's Defence Research and Development Organisation.

Development

In 2006  the Indian Space Research Organisation performed a series of ground tests to demonstrate stable supersonic combustion for nearly 7 seconds with an inlet Mach number of 6.

It carried a passive scramjet engine combustor module as a test-bed for demonstration of air-breathing propulsion technology.

In January 2012, ISRO announced that a scaled prototype, called Reusable Launch Vehicle-Technology Demonstrator (RLV-TD), was approved to be built and tested. The aerodynamics characterization on the RLV-TD prototype was done by National Aerospace Laboratories in India. The RLV-TD is in the last stages of construction by a Hyderabad-based private company called CIM Technologies.

By May 2015, engineers at the Vikram Sarabhai Space Centre (VSSC) in Thumba Equatorial Rocket Launching Station were installing thermal tiles on the outer surface of the RLV-TD to protect it against the intense heat during atmospheric reentry. This prototype weighs around 1.5 tonnes and flew to an altitude of 65 km mounted on top of an expendable solid booster HS9.

On August 28, 2016, ISRO successfully tested its scramjet engine on second developmental flight of its Advanced Technology Vehicle ATV-D02 from the Satish Dhawan Space Centre for 28 August 2016. The scramjet engine will be integrated to the RLV at a later stage of development.

Test flights

A total of four RLV-TD flights are planned by ISRO.

 HEX (Hypersonic Flight Experiment): completed on 23 May 2016.
 LEX (Landing Experiment): TBA
 REX (Return Flight Experiment): TBA
 SPEX (Scramjet Propulsion Experiment): TBA

Hypersonic Flight Experiment 

The Hypersonic Flight Experiment, or HEX, was the first test flight in the RLV-TD development program.  It was launched  from the first launchpad of Satish Dhawan Space Centre on 23 May 2016 at 7:00 AM local time on board a HS9 solid rocket booster.
 
After a successful launch, booster burn-out occurred 91.1 seconds into flight at a height of about 56 km, the RLV-TD separated from the HS9 booster and further ascended to a height of about 65 km. The RLV-TD then began its descent at about Mach 5 (five times the speed of sound). The vehicle was  tracked during its flight from ground stations at Sriharikota and a shipborne terminal. The total flight duration from launch to splashdown lasted about 770 seconds. The unit was not planned to be recovered.

In this flight, critical technologies such as autonomous navigation, guidance and control, and reusable thermal protection system, have been validated

See also

 Avatar, an unrelated spaceplane concept by India's DRDO 
 Hypersonic Flight Experiment
 Space Rider a planned robotic spaceplane by ESA

References

External links
 Home page for RLV-TD at ISRO 
 RLV-TD test flight animation at YouTube

Space programme of India